Quercus faginea, the Portuguese oak, is a species of oak native to the western Mediterranean region in the Iberian Peninsula. Similar trees in the Atlas Mountains of northwest Africa are usually included in this species, or sometimes treated as a distinct species, Quercus tlemcenensis. Out of all the oak forests in the Iberian Peninsula, the southern populations of Portuguese oak were found to have the highest diversity and endemism of spider species.

Description
The tree can live as long as 600 years. Leaf fall is typically in mid- to late winter. The flowers are catkins, produced between March and April, almost always before holm oak, which grows in similar areas. The acorns are oblong-ovoid, 2–2.5 cm long, maturing in 6 months to disperse in September or October.

The species commonly develops galls due to gall wasp activity; the galls are brown, 1–2 cm diameter, and have a spongy, cork-like interior.

The two subspecies are: 

Portuguese oak also hybridises readily with other related oaks such as Algerian oak (Q. canariensis) and downy oak (Q. pubescens), which can make identification difficult.

The specific name faginea refers to the superficial resemblance of the leaves to those of the beech (Fagus).

Uses
The wood has been used traditionally as firewood and as timber for construction (beams and posts). The acorns, like those of the holm oak or cork oak, are an important food for free-range black Iberian pigs reared for jamón ibérico production. It is also occasionally planted as an ornamental tree.

Gallery

References

External links
 Jean Louis Helardot, Chênes: Quercus faginea 

faginea
Flora of North Africa
Trees of Europe
Trees of Mediterranean climate
Drought-tolerant trees
Plants described in 1785